The 2014–15 season was the 83rd season in the existence of Real Zaragoza and the club's second consecutive season in the second division of Spanish football. In addition to the domestic league, Real Zaragoza participated in this season's edition of the Copa del Rey.

Players

Out on loan

Pre-season and friendlies

Competitions

Overall record

Segunda División

League table

Results summary

Results by round

Matches

Promotion play-offs

Copa del Rey

Statistics

Goalscorers 

Last updated: 17 June 2015

References

Real Zaragoza seasons
Zaragoza